National Highway 130CD, commonly referred to as NH 130CD is a national highway in India. It is a spur road of National Highway 30.  NH-130CD traverses the states of Odisha and Chhattisgarh in India.

Route 
Chhattisgarh
Kurud, Umarda, Megha, Bijhuli, Singhpur, Dugli, Dongardula, Nagari, Sonamagar, Sihawa, Ratawa - Odisha border.
Odisha
Chhattisgarh Border - Ghutkel, Kundei, Hatabharandi, Raighar, Beheda, Umerkote, Dhodra, Dhamanaguda, Dabugaon - Papadahandi.

Junctions  

  Terminal near Barapali.
  Terminal near Sohela.

See also 
 List of National Highways in India
 List of National Highways in India by state

References

External links 

 NH 130CD on OpenStreetMap

National highways in India
National Highways in Odisha
National Highways in Chhattisgarh